Cust is an English surname. It may refer to:
 Cust baronets, a Baronetage of England and a Baronetage of the United Kingdom
 Albinia Wherry  Cust (1857-1929), daughter of Robert Needham
 Aleen Cust (1868–1937), Irish veterinary surgeon
 Archer Cust (1896–1962), British civil servant and art historian
 Brownlow Cust, 1st Baron Brownlow (1744–1808), English Member of Parliament
 Charles Cust (1813–1875), British soldier and Conservative politician
 Edward Cust (1794–1878),  British soldier, politician and courtier
 Edwards Cust (1804–1895), Archdeacon of Richmond from 1868 until 1894
 Harry Cust (1861–1917), English journalist, poet, and Member of Parliament
 Henry Cockayne Cust (1780–1861), Canon of Windsor from 1813 to 1861
 Jack Cust (born 1979), American baseball outfielder
 John Cust (footballer) (1874–1954), Scottish footballer
 Lionel Cust (1859–1929), English art historian and museum director
 Maria Cust (1862 or 1863 - 1958), English geographer, daughter of Robert Needham
 Peregrine Cust (disambiguation), multiple people
 Richard Cust (disambiguation), multiple people
 Robert Needham Cust (1821–1909), British colonial administrator and linguist, father of Albinia and Maria
 Sir John Cust, 3rd Baronet (1718–1770), British politician
 William Cust (1787–1845), British barrister and Member of Parliament

See also 
 Cust (disambiguation)

English-language surnames